Pritam Pyare Aur Woh is an Indian horror comedy television series on SAB TV, aired on 3 March 2014.

Plot
'Pritam Pyare Aur Woh' show is described as a horror comedy featuring Indian television's first ghost buster. It is based on the lives of Pritam and Pyare who save everyone's lives with the help of Macky Bhootmare. They also have a secret crush on Tiku Killawala's secretary, Mary. Dara Koyla and Bhootrina are the main ghost leads that freak Pritam and Pyaare out. The main characters are Pritam, Pyaare, Tiku and his wife Gogi, Mary, Dara Koyla, Damroo (Dara's assistant), and Bhootrina.

Cast 
Siddharth Sagar as Pritam
Prasad Barve as Pyaare
Tiku Talsania as Tiku Kilawala
Melissa Pais as Bhootrina
Rajesh Kumar as Dara Koyla
Tapasya Nayak Srivastava as Mary 
Parineeta Borthakur as Gogi
Aarti Rana as Jigna
Neetha Shetty as Sweatrina

References

External links
 Official website

Sony SAB original programming
Indian drama television series
Indian television sitcoms
Indian fantasy television series
Indian supernatural television series
Ghosts in television
2014 Indian television series debuts
2014 Indian television series endings
Vampires in television
Television series by Optimystix Entertainment
Indian horror fiction television series